Lillestrøm is a town located some  east-northeast of Oslo, the capital city of Norway. With a population of 14,379 inhabitants (18,805 including Kjeller), it is the administrative centre of Lillestrøm Municipality in Viken County, and lies within the traditional district of Romerike.

Etymology 
The name means "the little [part of] Strøm", Strøm being the name of an old and large farm (Old Norse: straumr, which also meant "stream" as well).

History 
Lillestrøm's history dates back to the times river powered sawmills came into use for the production of building materials. Later Lillestrøm got its own steam sawmill which laid the base for the development of the area that became the town. The area was, by and large, a moss covered swamp-like area, at the time considered almost uninhabitable. However, the almost non-existent property values were judged to be a fair exchange and so the workers started living and settling in the area around the sawmill, and Lillestrøm was born.

On 1 January 1908 Lillestrøm became a municipality of its own, having been split from Skedsmo. At that time Lillestrøm municipality had a population of 4,351. On 1 January 1962 the two municipalities were reunited under the name Skedsmo. Before the merger Lillestrøm municipality had a population of 10,840.

In 1997, Skedsmo municipal council declared Lillestrøm to be a town (by) in its own right (an honorary status which has no effect upon the organization of local government). The event is commemorated annually with a 4-day street fair.

Transport

Road
Norwegian national road 159 is a four-lane motorway connecting central Lillestrøm and Oslo. The E6 motorway bypasses Lillestrøm a few kilometres to the west on its way from Oslo to the north of the country. National road 22, running from northwest to southeast, passes through the north of the town.

Rail
Lillestrøm is connected to Oslo by three separate railway lines. The Trunk Line (opened 1854) running south to Oslo via the Grorud valley is used mostly by commuter and freight trains, while the northern part of the line carries frequent local passenger trains as far as Dal as well as freight trains to Eidsvoll, Lillehammer, and Trondheim. Non-stop commuter, airport express, and long-distance express trains use the high-speed Gardermoen Line (opened 1999), which runs mostly through tunnels from Oslo to Lillestrøm, is used by airport express trains, regional trains to Eidsvoll and Lillehammer, and long-distance passenger services to Trondheim to the north. The Kongsvinger Line (opened 1862), running northeast from Lillestrøm conveys hourly local trains to Kongsvinger as well as a number of longer-distance passenger and freight trains to and from Sweden.

Air 
Kjeller, a town contiguous with the north of Lillestrøm, is the site of Kjeller Airfield, which has a long history of both military and civilian use. Founded in 1912, it is one of the world's oldest airports. Today, the airfield is used mainly by light aircraft, and major air traffic is routed to the international airport at Gardermoen (opened 1998). In November 2016, the Norwegian government decided that they would close the airfield by 2023 and plans to redevelop the land for housing and small businesses.

Education

Lillestrøm is home to three primary schools (Vigernes, Volla and Kjeller), a lower secondary school (Kjellervolla), and two upper secondary schools (Lillestrøm and Skedsmo). The town also hosts a Folkeuniversitet campus, the Norwegian Correctional Service's college and a satellite campus of Oslo Metropolitan University.

Government
The municipality in Lillestrøm is controlled by the local Labor party. Since 2011, Ole Jacob Flæten has been Lillestrøm's mayor.

The head office of Accident Investigation Board Norway is located in Lillestrøm.

Sport
The local football team, Lillestrøm SK, plays in the Eliteserien. Their home ground is Åråsen stadion.

The nearby Lillestrøm stadion is used for training, and was an ice hockey venue at the 1952 Winter Olympics. There are also two indoor arenas, one multi-purpose (Skedsmohallen) and one for football (LSK-Hallen), and in 2007 a track and field stadium Romerike Friidrettsstadion was built as a cooperation between the municipalities Skedsmo, Rælingen and Lørenskog.

The local track and field club is named Minerva. Athletes such as Hanne Haugland and Håkon Särnblom have represented the club.

Rugby league is represented by newly formed rugby league club Lillestrøm Lions RLK, who are Scandinavia's first ever rugby league club.

Notable people associated with Lillestrøm
Arild Andersen (1945–), jazz musician
Pål Steffen Andresen (1982–), footballer
Peder Borgen (1928–), theologian
Sasha Gabor (1945–2008, actor
Fredrik Gulbrandsen (1992–), footballer
Chris Holsten (1993–), singer, songwriter
Anne Holt (Larvik 1958–), crimewriter, politician
Carl Fredrik Lowzow (Oslo 1992–2009), politician
Jan Mangerud (Oslo 1937–), geologist
Bjarne Andre Myklebust (1972–), media professional
Bjørn Nyland (1962–), speed skater
Thomas Skoglund (1993–), handball player
Kjell Sørensen (1930–), sports shooter
Kay Stenshjemmet (1953–), speed skater

Culture
Nitja Center of contemporary Art is located in Lillestrøm.

References

External links

Norwegian Defense Research Establishment
Airport train, "Flytoget"
Lillestrøm torv 
Lillstrøm Sportsclub, LSK 
Lillestrøm cultural centre 
VisitLillestrom.no 

 
Former municipalities of Norway
Cities and towns in Norway
Populated places in Akershus
Skedsmo